Heroes of the Resistance is a set of twenty-three stamps issued from 1957 to 1961 by La Poste, commemorating 27 members of the French Resistance who died during the Occupation of France between 1940 and 1945 (apart from Edmond Debeaumarché, who died in 1959).  Of the 27, two were Catholic monks and nuns and three were women.

Commemorated heroes
Issued 18 May 1957
Jean Moulin (1899-1943)
D'Estienne d'Orves (1901–1941)
Robert Keller (1899–1945)
Pierre Brossolette (1903–1944)
Jean-Baptiste Lebas (1878–1944)

Issued 19 April 1958
Jean Cavailles (1903–1944)
Fred Scamaroni (1914–1943)
Simone Michel-Levy (1906–1945)
Jacques Bingen (1908–1944)

Issued 25 April 1959
Five Martyrs of the lycée Buffon
Jean-Marie Arthus (1925–1943)
Jacques Baudry (1922–1943)
Pierre Benoit (1925–1943)
Pierre Grelot (1923–1943)
Lucien Legros (1924–1943)
Yvonne Le Roux (1882–1945)
Mederic Vedy (1902–1944)
Louis Martin-Bret (1898–1944)
Gaston Moutardier (1889–1944)

Issued 26 March 1960
Edmond Debeaumarché (1906–1959)
Pierre Masse (1879–1942)
Maurice Ripoche (1895–1944)
Leonce Vieljeux (1865–1944)
Rene Bonpain (1908–1943)

Issued 22 April 1961
Jacques Renouvin (1905–1944)
Lionel Dubray (1923–1944)
Paul Gateaud (1889–1944)
Mother Elizabeth (1890–1945)

References

French Resistance
Postage stamps of France